Mohammad Nasser Saghaye-Biria is an Iranian Shi'a cleric, conservative politician and head of psychology department at Imam Khomeini Educational Research Institute. He is a senior member of Front of Islamic Revolution Stability. In the early 2000s, Saghaye-Biria was Imam of The Islamic Education Center of Houston, Texas.

He is a protégé of Mohammad Taqi Mesbah Yazdi and served as an advisor to Mahmoud Ahmadinejad on clerical and religious affairs.

Electoral history

Bibliography

References

Presidential advisers of Iran
Living people
Front of Islamic Revolution Stability politicians
McGill University alumni
University of Houston alumni
Imams in North America
People from Kermanshah
Imam Khomeini's Educational and Research Institute
1958 births